Dalton is a village in  east of New Hanover and  south of Greytown in the uMshwati Local Municipality of KwaZulu-Natal, South Africa

The town is named after North Dalton in Yorkshire, the hometown of Henry Boast, who organized an immigration to Natal in 1850 of people from Yorkshire. It is the railway junction for the Noodsberg line.

The main local industry is the production of sugarcane, with the Union Cooperative and Illovo Noodsberg mills nearby.

References

Populated places in the uMshwathi Local Municipality